Glenn Cockerill (born 25 August 1959) is an English retired footballer who played more than 700 games in The Football League in a 22-year career. He was a skilled central midfielder renowned for his passing and shooting skills.

Playing career
Cockerill began his career at non-league Louth United, and made his name in the professional game at Lincoln City. He also played for Swindon Town and Sheffield United before joining Southampton in October 1985. He left the Saints in December 1993, having made 358 appearances for the club in all competitions, and later spent three seasons at Leyton Orient, before finishing his career with spells at Fulham and Brentford.

In 1988, while playing for Southampton, Cockerill was punched in the face by Paul Davis of Arsenal, breaking his jaw. Although the referee failed to spot the incident, Davis subsequently received a nine-match ban and a £3,000 fine.

Management and coaching career
In 2002, Cockerill was appointed manager of Conference side Woking. He spent five seasons as manager at Kingfield, before being relieved of his duties in March 2007. He is now semi-retired.

In August 2008 Brighton and Hove Albion Manager Micky Adams added Cockerill to his scouting network.

On 4 April 2010, he was appointed manager of Winchester City of the Wessex League although he remained in charge for only a few months, parting company with Winchester by mutual consent in September 2010.

Personal life
He is the son of Ron and brother of John Cockerill, both also professional footballers.

Career statistics

Honours
Southampton
Full Members Cup finalist: 1992

References

External links

1959 births
Living people
English footballers
Footballers from Grimsby
Louth United F.C. players
Lincoln City F.C. players
Swindon Town F.C. players
Sheffield United F.C. players
Southampton F.C. players
Leyton Orient F.C. players
Fulham F.C. players
Brentford F.C. players
English football managers
Fulham F.C. non-playing staff
Woking F.C. managers
Winchester City F.C. managers
Brentford F.C. non-playing staff
Association football midfielders
Premier League players